Nueva Cáceres may refer to the following:
 Ciudad de Nueva Cáceres - Former Philippine city during Spanish period that is now composed of Naga City, Canaman and Camaligan, Camarines Sur
Roman Catholic Archdiocese of Caceres
University of Nueva Caceres